Velgatoor is a Town and mandal headquarter of Velgatoor mandal in Jagtial district in the state of Telangana in India.

Demographics
According to 2011 Census, demographics of the village are:
Total population: 4,463
Males population: 2,248
Female population: 2,215
Number of households: 1,218
Literacy rate: 60.19%

References 

Villages in Jagtial district
Mandal headquarters in Jagtial district